Field Day is an outdoor music festival held every year on New Year's Day in Sydney at The Domain. It is a one-day music festival showcasing hip-hop, house, indie and electronic artists from all over the world. The event has been running since 2002 and has become a popular annual music event, attracting over 20,000 people.

In 2007 and 2008 Field Day was voted the best festival in New South Wales in the annual InTheMix 50.

There was no Field Day in 2021.

Field Day 2002

Field Day 2003

Field Day 2004

Field Day 2005

Field Day 2006

Field Day 2007

Field Day 2008

Field Day 2009

Field Day 2010

Field Day 2011

Field Day 2012

Field Day 2013

Field Day 2014

Field Day 2015

Field Day 2016

Field Day 2017

Field Day 2018

 Princess Nokia withdrew from the lineup due to illness and was replaced by Big Shaq and Running Touch

Field Day 2019

 Migos withdrew from the lineup for unspecified reasons and were replaced by Sheck Wes and Juice Wrld

Field Day 2020

Field Day 2022
Due to travel restrictions (both national and international) related to the COVID-19 Pandemic in Australia the 2022 edition featured a smaller all-Australian lineup

Field Day 2023

 Yeat withdrew from the lineup for unknown reasons and was replaced by Mike Dimes

See also
Parklife Music Festival

References

External links
Official Fuzzy website
inthemix | Field Day
Official Facebook fan page

Music festivals in Australia
Festivals in Sydney